Battle Through Time is a computer game for the Commodore 64 computer, programmed by Ken Grant. This video game is a side-scrolling ground-based shoot 'em up game drawing obvious influence from the arcade game Moon Patrol.

Gameplay

The basic gameplay is similar to Moon Patrol, in that the player has to drive a jeep through rough landscape and jump over potholes and obstacles, and shoot at enemies both on the ground and in the sky. The player has to travel ten miles in each level before they can progress to the next one.

Battle Through Time is themed after the most famous wars in the 20th century. It has seven levels, each with their own settings:
 World War I
 World War II
 The Korean War
 The Vietnam War
 World War III
 War Mutations, an alien-looking landscape almost devoid of enemies, only riddled with obstacles
 In the Beginning, back to Stone Age, with a Tyrannosaurus rex as an end-of-level boss.

Each level has its own music theme, which consist of computer renditions of various famous melodies, such as Symphony #5 by Ludwig van Beethoven and The Blue Danube by Johann Strauss the Younger, and contemporary classics such as the Darth Vader theme.

Reception

Big K gave the game an overall score of 'two Ks' out of three. Home Computing Weekly gave it four stars out of five. Computer Gamer gave it three stars out of five.

References

 Battle Through Time at GameFAQs
 

1984 video games
Action video games
Anco Software games
Commodore 64 games
Commodore 64-only games
Single-player video games
Video game clones
Video games developed in the United Kingdom